The Lovatelli urn is a 1st century BCE marble funerary urn from the early Roman imperial period. It is thought to depict Persephone, Demeter and Triptolemus, the triad of the Eleusinian mysteries, however, there are several different competing interpretations about the figures and their meaning in the literature.

It was found during an 1875 excavation of the columbarium of the Statilii on the Esquiline Hill near Porta Maggiore in Rome, Italy. This area contained the remains of freed slaves and servants of the family. The object is named after Ersilia Caetani Lovatelli, an Italian art historian and archaeologist who first published a description of it in 1896.  It is held in the collection of the National Roman Museum.

Background 

The urn was discovered during the excavation of the columbarium of the Statilii family by Italian archaeologists Edoardo Brizio and Rodolfo Lanciani from 1875 to 1877. They discovered three chamber tombs referred to as N, O, and P.

Description 

The urn depicts three separate scenes, thought to portray a preliminary initiation and purification rite from the Lesser Eleusinian Mysteries, often described as myesis. The imagery is often compared and contrasted with the Torre Nova sarcophagus first identified by Giulio Emanuele Rizzo in 1910. Lovatelli describes such an urn in 1879 in her work "Di un vaso cinerario con rappresentanze relative ai misteri di Eleusi". Her style is evident in her writing. She talks within the scientific methods required but she pulls in other related and referenced works. This differed from her male contemporaries.

See also 
 Roman funerary art
 Roman funerary practices

References

Further reading 

 Borbonus, D. (2014). Columbarium Tombs and Collective Identity in Augustan Rome. Cambridge University Press. .
 George, M. (2013). Roman Slavery and Roman Material Culture. University of Toronto Press. pp. 44–46. 
 Mylonas, G. E. (1961). Eleusis and the Eleusinian Mysteries. Princeton University Press.

External links 

 Digital LIMC. Lexicon Iconographicum Mythologiae Classicae.

Funerary art
1st-century BC sculptures
Collections of the National Roman Museum
1875 archaeological discoveries
Archaeological discoveries in Italy
Eleusinian Mysteries